Alberta Provincial Highway No. 41, commonly referred to as Highway 41 and officially named Buffalo Trail, is a  north-south highway in eastern Alberta, Canada. It extends from the United States border at Wild Horse to Highway 55 in the hamlet of La Corey north of Bonnyville.

Route description

Major intersections 
From south to north:

Highway 41A 

Alberta Provincial Highway No. 41A is the designation of an alternate route off Highway 41 serving the City of Medicine Hat. It winds through Medicine Hat and terminates at its junction with the Trans-Canada Highway and the Crowsnest Highway (Highway 3) west of the downtown core.

Major intersections 
Starting from the east end of Highway 41A.

References 

041